The Apulian regional election of 1975 took place on 15 June 1975.

Events
Christian Democracy was by far the largest party, while the Italian Communist Party came distantly second. After the election Christian Democrat Nicola Rotolo was elected President of the Region at the head of a centre-left coalition (Organic Centre-left). In 1978 Rotolo was replaced by fellow Christian Democrat Nicola Quarta.

Results

Source: Ministry of the Interior

Elections in Apulia
1975 elections in Italy